Asnois is the name of two communes in France:

 Asnois, Nièvre, in the Nièvre department
 Asnois, Vienne, in the Vienne department